Hannah Rosenwald School is a historic Rosenwald school located near Newberry, Newberry County, South Carolina.  It was built in 1924–1925, and is a one-story, frame, three-teacher type school.  The school included three classrooms, three cloakrooms, an industrial room, and an entry hall. The school was affiliated with the Hannah A.M.E. Church and closed in the 1960s.

It was listed on the National Register of Historic Places in 2009.

References

School buildings on the National Register of Historic Places in South Carolina
Defunct schools in South Carolina
Educational institutions established in 1925
African-American history of South Carolina
Buildings and structures in Newberry County, South Carolina
Rosenwald schools in South Carolina
1925 establishments in South Carolina
National Register of Historic Places in Newberry County, South Carolina